The Leavenworth Colored Militia Infantry was a segregated African American militia infantry regiment that served in the Union Army during the American Civil War.

Service
The Leavenworth Colored Militia Infantry was called into service to defend Kansas against Maj. Gen. Sterling Price's raid on October 9, 1864. It was on duty at Fort Leavenworth. After the defeat of Price the unit was disbanded on October 29.

Commanders
 Captain James L. Rafferty
 Captain Richard J. Hinton

See also

 List of Kansas Civil War Units
 Kansas in the Civil War

References
 Dyer, Frederick H. A Compendium of the War of the Rebellion (Des Moines, IA: Dyer Pub. Co.), 1908.
Attribution
 

Military units and formations established in 1864
Military units and formations disestablished in 1864
Units and formations of the Union Army from Kansas
Kansas Militia
1864 establishments in Kansas